Boulder Bridge and Ross Drive Bridge are two bridges in Washington, D.C. that are together listed in the National Register of Historic Places: Boulder Bridge and Ross Drive Bridge.

Road bridges in Washington, D.C.